Seleniolycus is a genus of marine ray-finned fishes belonging to the family Zoarcidae, the eelpouts. The fishes in this genus are found in the Southern Ocean.

Species
The following species are classified within the genus Seleniolycus:

References

Gymnelinae